Boardwalk Pipeline Partners, LP, which conducts business through its primary subsidiary Boardwalk Pipelines, LP and its subsidiaries, is an energy company based in Houston, Texas. It is a master limited partnership operating in the midstream portion of the natural gas and natural gas liquids (NGLs) industry, primarily providing transportation and storage for those commodities. Boardwalk's pipeline system originates in the Gulf Coast region, Oklahoma and Arkansas and extends north and east to the Midwestern states of Tennessee, Kentucky, Illinois, Indiana, and Ohio, and Boardwalk's NGLs pipeline and storage facilities are located in Louisiana and Texas.

Boardwalk Pipelines Holding Corp., which is a wholly owned subsidiary of Loews Corporation, owns 100% of Boardwalk Pipeline Partners's capital.

Operations
Boardwalk serves a broad mix of customers, including producers of natural gas, local distribution companies (LDCs), marketers, electric power generators, industrial users and interstate and intrastate pipelines. Boardwalk provides a significant portion of pipeline transportation and storage services through firm contracts under which customers pay monthly capacity reservation charges (which are charges owed regardless of actual pipeline or storage capacity utilization). Other charges are based on actual utilization of the capacity under firm contracts and contracts for interruptible services. For the twelve months ended December 31, 2016, approximately 81% of revenues were derived from capacity reservation charges under firm contracts, approximately 12% of revenues were derived from charges based on actual utilization under firm contracts and approximately 7% of revenues were derived from interruptible transportation, interruptible storage, parking and lending (PAL) and other services.

Boardwalk has the following operating subsidiaries: 
 Texas Gas Transmission, LLC
 Gulf South Pipeline Pipeline Company, LP
 Gulf Crossing Pipeline Company, LLC
 Boardwalk Louisiana Midstream, LLC
 Boardwalk Petrochemical Pipeline, LLC
 Boardwalk Field Services, LLC

History
Loews Corporation (NYSE: L) bought Texas Gas Transmission, LLC in May 2003 and Gulf South Pipeline Company, LP in December 2004.

These two interstate natural gas pipeline companies were consolidated into a new entity – Boardwalk Pipeline Partners, LP – which went public in 2005. Boardwalk placed into service a third interstate natural gas pipeline company, Gulf Crossing Pipeline Company LLC, in 2009.

In 2011, Boardwalk acquired the Petal and Hattiesburg natural gas storage companies, which were merged into Gulf South in 2015.

In 2012, Boardwalk acquired Boardwalk Louisiana Midstream, LLC, which diversified Boardwalk's operations into the natural gas liquids business, serving petrochemical markets in southern Louisiana.

In 2014, Boardwalk acquired Evangeline ethylene pipeline system, further expanding Boardwalk's service offerings to petrochemical customers. Boardwalk Field Services, LLC develops and operates gas gathering, compression, dehydration, treating, and processing infrastructure, and in June 2013 placed its processing plant into service.

In 2018, Loews Corporation acquired Boardwalk so that it became a subsidiary company, with its stock being delisted from the New York Stock Exchange.

In 2021 the Delaware Court of Chancery ruled for the former partners in the case Bandera Master Fund LP et al v Boardwalk Pipeline Partners LP et al which awarded them $690M, but the case is being appealed.

References

Companies formerly listed on the New York Stock Exchange
Natural gas pipeline companies
Natural gas companies of the United States
Companies based in Houston